Agnes of Glasgow (1760–1780) was a Scottish woman who became a figure of American folklore.

Born in Glasgow, Scotland, Agnes followed her lover, Lt. Angus McPherson, who was a British Army officer, to America during the American Revolution. She stowed away on a ship bound from England to America, arriving in Charleston, South Carolina. Believing his unit was assigned near Camden, in Kershaw County, South Carolina, and having heard that he may have been wounded, she wandered through towns and the wilderness hoping to make contact with him or someone who knew him. However, she became ill and died before she could find him. She was buried under cover of darkness by Wateree American Indian King Hagler, who had befriended her.

Local legend maintains that she searches for her lover still, and that her ghost haunts the Bethesda Presbyterian Church where she was buried, and the surrounding wooded area to present day. The legend is such that it has received media attention in South Carolina, as well as ghost hunters from around the country. Local historians confirm that the British Army did arrive in Camden during that year, but since her tombstone reads she died on 12 February, they would not have been in Camden at the time of her death. Also, Hagler died in 1763, at which time Agnes was still a child in Scotland.

References

External links

Agnes of Glasgow legend 
"The State" article on Agnes of Glasgow

1760 births
1780 deaths
Scottish ghosts
Scottish emigrants to the Thirteen Colonies
American ghosts
18th-century Scottish women